Elaphidion tocanum is an extinct species of beetle in the family Cerambycidae. It was described by Vitali in 2009.

References

tocanum
Beetles of North America
Burdigalian life
Neogene Dominican Republic
Miocene insects of North America
Prehistoric insects of the Caribbean
Fauna of Hispaniola
Extinct animals of the Dominican Republic
Extinct animals of Haiti
Insects of the Dominican Republic
Fossils of the Dominican Republic
Dominican amber
Insects of Haiti
Beetles described in 2009